M. Paranjothi is an Indian politician and was a member of the Tamil Nadu legislative assembly from Tiruchirappalli West constituency.  As a cadre of All India Anna Dravida Munnetra Kazhagam, he was previously elected to Srirangam constituency in 2006 elections.

Paranjothi won a by-election in the Tiruchirappalli West constituency in 2011 and in November of that year a cabinet reshuffle by Jayalalithaa resulted in him replacing both S. P. Shanmuganathan as Minister for Hindu Religious and Charitable Endowments and G. Senthamizhan as Minister for Information, Law and Courts.

References 

Members of the Tamil Nadu Legislative Assembly
All India Anna Dravida Munnetra Kazhagam politicians
Living people
Year of birth missing (living people)